For many decades, Kansas has had a vibrant country and bluegrass scene. The Country Stampede Music Festival – one of the largest music festivals in the country – and the bluegrass/acoustic Walnut Valley Festival are testament to the continued popularity of these music genres in the state. Among current leading country artists, Martina McBride and Chely Wright are natives of Kansas.

The state has also fostered some rock acts – the one that is most associated with the state is almost certainly the band called Kansas.  Some famous and pioneering jazz musicians also had roots in Kansas.

History 

The first music performed in the area that is now Kansas was that of the Indigenous peoples who lived there.

The earliest documented music comes after settlement by Anglo-Americans in the 1850s. One of the first musical works relating to Kansas was "Ho! For the Kansas Plains", a song written by James G. Clark in the 1850s, which mythologized the territory as the site of abolitionist battles during the Bleeding Kansas era. A representative lyric was "Ho! For the Kansas plains; Where men shall live in liberty; Free from the tyrant's chains." Along the same lines, some versions of the famous Civil War marching song "John Brown's Body" refer to John Brown's abolitionist activities in Kansas Territory during the same era.

Following the Civil War, as Kansas became known more for its cowboys, saloons and wide-open spaces, another notable song written in and about Kansas was "Home on the Range". It was penned in the state in the 1870s, and then spread throughout the American Old West as an unofficial anthem. It is now Kansas's official state song. The song established something of a template for Kansas music, and over the next several decades, music coming from Kansas remained in a similar folk or old-time music style, while lyrics referencing the state tended to focus on its open countryside.

Composer and musician Nathaniel Clark Smith, born at Fort Leavenworth, was an important music educator in the early 1900s.  In the 1920s, the Kansas City jazz scene developed in eastern Kansas. Coleman Hawkins, who introduced the tenor saxophone to jazz, was raised in Topeka, and began touring in eastern Kansas by 1918 (at the age of 14). Singer Ada Brown was born in Kansas City.  Drummer Kansas Fields was born in Chapman.  Pianist, singer, and bandleader Joe Sanders was born in Thayer.  Harpist Betty Glamann was born in Wellington.  Singer and composer Nora Holt, a figure in the Harlem Renaissance, was born in Kansas City, Kansas. Choral conductor Eva Jessye, a contemporary of Holt, was born in Lawrence.  In the following years, Kansas native Charlie Parker (d. 1955, buried near Kansas City, MO) also came to prominence in Kansas City. Around the same time, Kansan Stan Kenton likewise became notable as a jazz band leader and pianist. Pianist Jesse Stone was born in Atchison. Alto saxophonist Bobby Watson was born in Lawrence.

Outsider musician and composer Moondog was born in Marysville.

Mid-century
Joe Walsh of Eagles and James Gang fame is a native of Wichita, although he spent his youth in Columbus, Ohio. Melissa Etheridge and Katrina Leskanich (lead singer for Katrina and the Waves) are also native Kansans. Gene Clark, founding member of The Byrds, attended high school in Bonner Springs and began performing in the state. Dawayne Bailey, a native of Manhattan, Kansas, toured and recorded with rock legends Bob Seger and Chicago. Stanley Sheldon, a bassist from Ottawa, played with Peter Frampton at the height of his career in the mid-1970s, including the top selling Frampton Comes Alive!. Sheldon contributed as both bassist and songwriter on Frampton's instrumental album Fingerprints, which was a Grammy winner in 2007. Sheldon went on to perform with Warren Zevon, Lou Gramm of Foreigner, and Delbert McClinton. Grammy and Dove Award winning guitarist Phil Keaggy was a resident of Leawood in the 1980s. Jennifer Knapp, born in Chanute, is a Grammy-nominated, Dove Award-winning Christian folk rock musician whose first album, released in 1998, was certified gold. Finally, Shooting Star, notable for being the first American act signed by Virgin Records, hailed from Overland Park.

1960s 
In the 1960s, R&B, blue-eyed soul, and garage rock bands became popular with acts such as the Fabulous Flippers, The Blue Things, the Red Dogs, The Serfs, Eric & The Norsemen, The Sensational Showmen of Concordia, Wade Flemons, and Mike Finnigan traveling the Midwest and releasing regional singles.

1980s 
In the early 1980s, Wichita, Topeka, and Lawrence, together with Kansas City, Missouri had a significant hardcore punk scene, centered at Lawrence's University of Kansas campus, and later at the Outhouse. Among the most popular bands were The Embarrassment, Get Smart!, and Mortal Micronotz.

1990s 
In the 1990s, Kansas produced some bands that found regional and national success taking the predominant grunge aesthetic and adding a rockabilly or country music twang, a style sometimes grouped into Alternative country.

Paw, out of Lawrence became the most well-known of these bands following the 1993 release of their major-label album Dragline.  Truck Stop Love, out of Manhattan, Kansas, had a somewhat similar sound and was also signed to a national label, Scotti Brothers Records, with the well-received How I Spent My Summer Vacation being an appropriate swan song. The Moving Van Goghs, also from Manhattan, with a psychedelic/rock aesthetic, is also a notable band during the "pre-grunge" time period in the Kansas music scene. Finally, Kill Creek, a Lawrence band since the 1980s period was signed by Mammoth Recordings and achieved critical national attention with three full LPs and an EP.  The sound of these bands was comparable to some Neil Young and their out-of-state contemporaries Uncle Tupelo, Dinosaur Jr. (circa 1993), The Jayhawks, and Mule.  Other bands from Kansas signed during the same period included Shiner, Sin City Disciples, Season to Risk, Everywhere, and Arthur Dodge and the Horsefeathers.
Early contemporaries included The Pedaljets, a band fronted by Mike Allmayer who later formed Grither. The Pedaljets put out two LPs, Today Today (Twilight), The Pedaljets (Communion), and one 45 (Throbbing Lobster). Both albums received critical national attention. The Pedaljets toured the US extensively from 1984–1990, often opening for Husker Du, The Flaming Lips, Soul Asylum, The Replacements, Meat Puppets, and other well known alternative bands of the 1980s.  Late contemporaries included Grither, Zoom, Vitreous Humor, Believe it or Nots, and Stick. Notable musicians of this time to come from Kansas are Mark Hart, Danny Carey, Kliph Scurlock, and Brody Buster.

DVS Mindz was an underground hip hop group formed in Topeka in 1993.

2000s

Midwest hip hop artists XV from Wichita and Emcee N.I.C.E. from Topeka emerged in the early 2000s. Kansas bands that gained notoriety were Ultimate Fakebook, Pomeroy, Frogpond, Paw, Mates of State, and Appleseed Cast.

Musical venues in Kansas 
The following are alphabetical lists of notable venues located in Kansas that regularly host musical acts.

Concert halls & theaters 
 Century II Convention Hall – Wichita
 Lied Center of Kansas – Lawrence
 McCain Auditorium – Manhattan
 Orpheum Theatre (Wichita, Kansas) - Wichita, Kansas
 Stiefel Theatre for the Performing Arts - Salina, Kansas
 Topeka Performing Arts Center – Topeka
 Yardley Hall - Overland Park, Kansas

Other notable indoor venues 
 The Bottleneck – Lawrence
 Bramlage Coliseum – Manhattan
 Cotillion Ballroom – Wichita
 D.J.'s – Concordia
 Eighth Street Taproom – Lawrence
 The Gas Light – Lawrence
 Granada Theater – Lawrence
 Grandmother's – Topeka
  Bank Arena – Wichita
 Jackpot Music Hall – Lawrence
 The Jazzhaus – Lawrence
 The Jolly Troll – Holton
 Kirby's Beer Store – Wichita
 Landon Arena/Kansas Expocentre – Topeka
 Liberty Hall – Lawrence
 Longhorn's Saloon – Manhattan
 Manhattan Arts Center – Manhattan
 McPherson Opera House (1889) – McPherson
 Memorial Hall – Kansas City
 Red Dog Inn – Lawrence
 Replay Lounge – Lawrence
 The Stiefel Theater - Salina
 The Wareham Opera House – Manhattan
 The Wave - Wichita
 The Yuk – Lawrence

Outdoor venues and festivals 
 Muddy Water Music Festival – Anthony
 Country Stampede Music Festival – Manhattan
 Walnut Valley Festival – Winfield
 Capitol Federal Park at Sandstone – Kansas City
 Lakefest Country Music Festival – Atchison
 Riverfest Park – De Soto

Bibliography
 Blush, Steven (2001). American Hardcore: A Tribal History. Los Angeles: Feral House. .

References

External links
 Kansas Music Hall of Fame

 
Kansas culture
Kansas